Kees van Baaren (22 October 1906 – 2 September 1970) was a Dutch composer and teacher.

Early years 
Van Baaren was born in Enschede.  His early studies (1924–29) were in Berlin with Rudolph Breithaupt (piano) and Friedrich Koch (composition) at the Stern conservatory. After returning to the Netherlands in 1929, he studied with Willem Pijper. He adopted Pijper's "germ cell technique" in his compositions from about 1934 onward. While composing some works in an accessible, tonal style, in other pieces he developed toward a serial technique, which emerged fully with the Septet for five winds, violin, and double bass (1952).

Career 
In 1948 Van Baaren became director of the Conservatoire of the Amsterdam Muzieklyceum Society (later merged into the Conservatoire of Amsterdam). In 1953 he was appointed director of the Utrechts Conservatorium. In 1958 he became director of the Royal Conservatory of The Hague. His students included many of the leading composers and performers of the next generation, including Louis Andriessen, Reinbert de Leeuw, Misha Mengelberg, Peter Schat, and Jan van Vlijmen. He died in Oegstgeest.

Selected works
 Concertino for piano and orchestra (1934)
 Sonatina in memoriam Willem Pijper, for piano (1948)
 The Hollow Men, cantata for soprano, baritone, mixed choir and orchestra, text by T. S. Eliot (1948, rev.1955-56)
 Septet for flute, oboe, clarinet, bassoon, horn, violin, and contrabass (1952)
 Symphony (1956)
 Variations for orchestra (1959)
 Music for Orchestra
 Partita for wind band (1961)
 String Quartet (1962)
 Wind Quintet (1963)
 Music for Carillon (1964)
 Concerto for piano and orchestra (1964)

References

Sources
 
 
 
 
 

1906 births
1970 deaths
20th-century classical composers
20th-century Dutch male musicians
Composers for carillon
Dutch classical composers
Dutch male classical composers
People from Enschede
Academic staff of the Royal Conservatory of The Hague
Twelve-tone and serial composers